The Division of City Schools – Navotas or simply the DCS-Navotas is a division under the supervision of the Department of Education. It also refers to the three-tier public education system in Navotas, the Philippines.

The main office of the DCS-Manila is situated at the main building of the Navotas City Hall. The DCS-Manila Superintendent is mandated by Republic Act No. 4196 (now the PLM Charter) to be a member of the six-man Board of Regents of the Pamantasan ng Lungsod ng Maynila.

The division has 1 college school, 10 public high schools, 35 public elementary schools.

References

Department of Education (Philippines)
Schools in Navotas